Nidal Haddad (born 5 March 1959) is a Syrian boxer. He competed in the men's featherweight event at the 1980 Summer Olympics. In his first fight, he lost to Carlos Gonzalez of Mexico.

References

1959 births
Living people
Syrian male boxers
Olympic boxers of Syria
Boxers at the 1980 Summer Olympics
Place of birth missing (living people)
Asian Games medalists in boxing
Boxers at the 1982 Asian Games
Asian Games bronze medalists for Syria
Medalists at the 1982 Asian Games
Featherweight boxers